Westons or Weston's may refer to:

Weston's Cider, Herefordshire, England
Westons Mill Pond, East Brunswick, New Jersey, United States
Weston's Music Hall, London, England
 George Weston Limited, a Canadian food production and distribution company

See also

Weston (disambiguation)
Weston (surname), disambiguation